David James McClure (born April 1, 1986) is an American basketball coach and former player who is currently an assistant coach for the Memphis Grizzlies of the National Basketball Association (NBA). He played college basketball at Duke before going on to play professionally in Lithuania.

College career 
At Duke, McClure was a role player for the program who was best known for his ability to guard multiple positions. His collegiate highlight came in 2007 against 17th-ranked Clemson when he made the game winning shot as the buzzer sounded to give Duke the victory.

Professional career 
After failing to secure an invitation to the Portsmouth Invitational Tournament, McClure went spent one season with the Austin Toros of the NBA D-League before going on to play for professional teams in Lithuania.

Coaching career

San Antonio Spurs 
After going through six knee surgeries, including two on both knees his final season playing, McClure joined the coaching ranks of the San Antonio Spurs with the help of Spurs assistant Chip Engelland, a fellow Duke alum who he met while attending the school's fantasy camp. With the Spurs, he worked as a player development coach and a video coordinator for Spurs assistant Ime Udoka, while also helping Spurs player Manu Ginóbili recover from a stress fracture in his leg.

Indiana Pacers 
McClure was named to the coaching staff of the Indiana Pacers in 2016 as a player development coach. He was promoted to assistant coach before the 2018–2019 season.

Memphis Grizzlies 
McClure joined the Memphis Grizzlies coaching staff in 2019. The move reunited him with Taylor Jenkins, who was an assistant coach with the Austin Toros when McClure was a member of the team.

References

External links 
 Duke profile

1986 births
Living people
Sportspeople from Danbury, Connecticut
People from Ridgefield, Connecticut
Basketball players from Connecticut
Basketball coaches from Connecticut
Forwards (basketball)
Duke Blue Devils men's basketball players
Austin Toros players
BC Neptūnas players
BC Nevėžis players
BC Šiauliai players
San Antonio Spurs assistant coaches
Indiana Pacers assistant coaches
Memphis Grizzlies assistant coaches